In Broad Daylight is a 1991 American made-for-television thriller drama film about the life of Ken McElroy, the town bully of Skidmore, Missouri who became known for his unsolved murder. McElroy was fictionalized as the character Len Rowan, portrayed by Brian Dennehy.  The film is based on Harry N. MacLean's nonfiction book of the same name.

Plot
Based on the true events in Skidmore, Missouri in 1981, the film centers around the town dealing with violent bully Len Rowan (Brian Dennehy). After a confrontation at a local grocery, Rowan begins stalking the owner Ruth Westerman (Cloris Leachman) and her husband Wes. The harassment culminates with Rowan shooting Wes and claiming self defense while standing trial. Through a series of legal maneuvers, Rowan prolongs his freedom for over a year, all the while continuing to harass anyone in the town who he feels is a threat including police. After he violates the orders of his appeal, the town decides to meet and figure out how to deal with him.

Cast
Brian Dennehy as Len Rowan
Cloris Leachman as Ruth Westerman
Marcia Gay Harden as Adina Rowan
Chris Cooper as Jack Wilson
John Anderson as Wes Westerman
Ken Jenkins as Bob Webb

Home media

The film was released on VHS in Canada and the UK, and on laserdisc for Asian markets.  It remains unreleased on DVD.

References

External links
 
 

1991 television films
1991 films
1990s biographical drama films
1990s thriller drama films
American biographical drama films
American thriller drama films
Thriller films based on actual events
Films set in the 20th century
Films based on non-fiction books
Films set in Missouri
NBC network original films
Films scored by Patrick Williams
American thriller television films
American drama television films
1990s English-language films
Films directed by James Steven Sadwith
1990s American films